Eric Franklin Wood (1947 – 3 November 2021) was a Canadian-American hydrologist.

Wood was born in Vancouver, British Columbia in 1947. He earned a bachelor's degree in civil engineering at the University of British Columbia in 1970, and completed a doctor of science degree in the subject at the Massachusetts Institute of Technology in 1974. He joined the Princeton University faculty in 1976, was later named Susan Dod Brown Professor of Civil and Environmental Engineering, and retired in 2019 with emeritus status. He was a fellow and 2010 awardee of the American Meteorological Society's Jule G. Charney Award. The Australian Academy of Technological Sciences and Engineering also granted Wood fellowship in 2010. Wood was selected a fellow of the Royal Society of Canada in 2013, received the European Geosciences Union's  in 2014, elected a member of the National Academy of Engineering in 2015, "[f]or development of land surface models and use of remote sensing for hydrologic modeling and prediction," and elected a fellow of the American Association for the Advancement of Science in 2017. The American Geophysical Union awarded fellowship, and in 2017, the Robert E. Horton Medal to Wood.

Wood died of cancer on 3 November 2021.

References

1947 births
2021 deaths
Canadian hydrologists
American hydrologists
Canadian emigrants to the United States
Scientists from Vancouver
Princeton University faculty
University of British Columbia alumni
Massachusetts Institute of Technology alumni
20th-century American engineers
Members of the United States National Academy of Engineering
21st-century American engineers
20th-century Canadian engineers
21st-century Canadian engineers
Canadian civil engineers
American civil engineers
Environmental engineers
Fellows of the American Association for the Advancement of Science
Fellows of the American Geophysical Union
Fellows of the American Meteorological Society
Fellows of the Royal Society of Canada
Fellows of the Australian Academy of Technological Sciences and Engineering
Deaths from cancer in New Jersey